Fiona Maude McDonald (born 1965) is a New Zealand pop singer and television personality.

Singer

McDonald's first involvement with music came through singing jingles for Auckland student radio station bFM. From that work she was asked to join Auckland band Diatribe which also included musician Greg Johnson. In the early '90s she teamed up with former bFM producers Mark Tierney and Paul Casserly who were looking for a singer for their new studio-only group, Strawpeople.

McDonald also briefly sang live with NRA, and provided guest vocals on the Headless Chickens on "Cruise Control". Reaching #6 in the charts, "Cruise Control" proved to be so popular that she was asked to join the band full-time. Three successful years of recording and touring followed, including number one single "George", but McDonald eventually left the band in 1995.

In the mid-'90s, McDonald continued to work with the Strawpeople and at the same time worked on songs for her solo album. A Different Hunger was released in 1999 with the first single "Sin Again" making it to #7 in the New Zealand charts.

Television

McDonald's first television work was in 1997 presenting @Xtra, a TV2 series about the internet. In 2005 McDonald was also one of the three judges in the first series of NZ Idol and presented the New Zealand version of 10 Years Younger.  She also presented the second series of arts show The Big Art Trip. In October 2012, she began work as a presenter on the new Shopping Channel.

Discography

Strawpeople 

 Hemisphere (1991) Pagan Records
 Worldservice (1992) Pagan Records
 Broadcast (1994) Epic Records
 Vicarious (1996) Columbia Records

Headless Chickens 

Body Blow (1991) Flying Nun Records
 Greedy (1997) Flying Nun Records

Album 

 A Different Hunger (1999)

Singles

References

External links
 Biography at Flying Nun
 Headless Chickens at Homebake
Biography from her agent

1965 births
Living people
New Zealand Idol
20th-century New Zealand women singers
New Zealand television personalities
Flying Nun Records artists
People from Huntly, New Zealand
People educated at Carmel College, Auckland